Sopranino refers to a singing voice that is higher than soprano.  It typically refers to a range of about E4 to E6, sometimes extending as high as G6.  A sopranino voice type is rare.  It is not considered a classical music part, but would be cast as a soprano.

References

Voice types